Doris Ying Tsao is an American systems neuroscientist and professor of biology at the University of California, Berkeley. She was formerly on the faculty at the California Institute of Technology. She is recognized for pioneering the use of fMRI with single-unit electrophysiological recordings and for discovering the macaque face patch system for face perception. She is a Howard Hughes Medical Institute Investigator and the director of the T&C Chen Center for Systems Neuroscience. She won a MacArthur "Genius" fellowship in 2018. Tsao was elected a member of the National Academy of Sciences in 2020.

Early life and education 
Tsao was born in Changzhou, China before her family immigrated to the United States when she was four. She grew up in College Park, Maryland and attended Springbrook High School. Her interest in science and in visual neuroscience in particular was inspired by her father, a machine vision researcher. She completed her B.S. in biology and mathematics in just three years at Caltech in 1996. She then worked with Margaret Livingstone at the Harvard Medical School, where she received her PhD in 2002 and continued to work as a postdoctoral fellow. In 2004 she received the Sofia Kovalevskaya Award from the Humboldt Foundation, which allowed her to start her own independent research group at the University of Bremen in Germany in 2006. In 2009 she joined the faculty at Caltech.

Career and research 
As a PhD student working with Margaret Livingstone, Tsao began by studying stereopsis in macaques using single-unit electrophysiological recordings. She then became interested in using fMRI, a technique usually used to visualize the activity of brain areas in humans, to image brain regions in macaques. She collaborated with Roger Tootell to use fMRI to image brain regions involved in depth perception, and then collaborated with Winrich Freiwald, a postdoctoral fellow working with Nancy Kanwisher at MIT, to combine single-unit electrophysiology with fMRI to study face perception in macaques. Similar to the fusiform face area identified in humans with, they discovered a series of small brain areas, referred to as the macaque face patch system, that contain neurons which are selectively activated by faces. Tsao and her lab have continued to make significant advances in understanding the specific facial features that cause neurons in these face patches to be activated. In 2017, her lab "cracked the code" of how our brains recognize faces, identifying the feature dimensions that cause face-selective neurons in different face patches of the IT cortex to respond to faces. Thus, the images of faces presented to the monkeys could be precisely reconstructed from face-selective neurons' activity.

Tsao was named in MIT Technology Review's TR35 list in 2007. She is serving on the Advisory Committee to the NIH Director (BRAIN Initiative Working Group 2.0) established in 2018, the group that advises on allocation of $1.511 billion toward neuroscience research.

See also
 List of neuroscientists

References

External links
Caltech Neuroscience

Living people
California Institute of Technology alumni
American people of Chinese descent
Educators from Changzhou
Harvard University alumni
American neuroscientists
American women neuroscientists
California Institute of Technology faculty
Howard Hughes Medical Investigators
MacArthur Fellows
Year of birth missing (living people)
Scientists from Changzhou
Members of the United States National Academy of Sciences
American women academics
21st-century American women